The Government Polytechnic Pen is an institute of technology located in Pen, Raigad district in the Indian state of Maharashtra. It was established in 1990 by the Government of Maharashtra and was initially located in Alibag.

References

Technical universities and colleges in India
Universities and colleges in Maharashtra
Education in Raigad district
Educational institutions established in 1990
1990 establishments in Maharashtra